The 1997 NAIA football season, as part of the 1997 college football season in the United States, was the 42nd season of college football sponsored by the NAIA. It was the first season after 27 season of the NAIA's two-division structure.

The season was played from August to November 1997, culminating in the 1997 NAIA Football National Championship, played this year on December 20, 1997 at Jim Carroll Stadium in Savannah, Tennessee.

Findlay defeated Willamette in the championship game, 14–7, to win their fourth NAIA national title.

Conference standings

Conference champions

Season events
The game was played at McCulloch Stadium in Salem, Oregon. Willamette won the game by a score of 27 to 0. During the game, Liz Heaston became the first woman to not only play but also to score in a college football game.

Postseason

See also
 1997 NCAA Division I-A football season
 1997 NCAA Division I-AA football season
 1997 NCAA Division II football season
 1997 NCAA Division III football season

References

 
NAIA Football National Championship